Secrest is a surname. Notable people with the surname include:

 Meryle Secrest, American biographer
 Patricia Secrest, American politician from Missouri
 Robert T. Secrest (1904–1994), American Democratic representative

See also
 Seacrest